Petra Cetkovská and Renata Voráčová were the defending champions, but Voráčová chose to participate at the 2015 Swedish Open instead. Cetkovská partnered Kateřina Kramperová, but lost in the first round to Cindy Burger and Kateřina Vaňková.

Lenka Kunčíková and Karolína Stuchlá won the title, defeating Burger and Vaňková in the final, 1–6, 6–4, [12–10].

Seeds

Draw

References 
 Draw

2015 ITF Women's Circuit
2015